The Treba (in its lower course Treuener Wasser) is a river of Saxony, Germany.

The Treba's source is near Neustadt. Southeast of Treuen, the Treba unites with the Lämmelsbach and is then called Treuener Wasser.

There is a gauging station for a stream gauge (OBF51650) and this lies within Special Area of Conservation 5439-301 "", which is a protected area and part of the Ore Mountains/Vogtland Nature Park.

See also 
List of rivers of Saxony

References 

Rivers of Saxony
Rivers of Germany